Etten may refer to:

 Etten-Leur, a south Netherlands town in North Brabant province that includes former town Etten, a home of Van Gogh
 Etten, Netherlands, a village in Gelderland province, which was a municipality until 1818 
 Nick Etten (1913-1990), an American baseball player

See also
 Van Etten